Kichokochwe (Swahili Magofu ya mji wa Kale wa Kichokochwe) is protected historic site located inside Wete District of Pemba North Region in Tanzania. The site is home to partially excavated abandoned late medieval Swahili ruins, with a mosque and tombs.

References

Swahili people
Swahili city-states
Swahili culture
Pemba Island